John Harwood (born 1946) was born in Hobart, Tasmania and is an Australian poet, literary critic and novelist.

Biography
Educated at the University of Tasmania and Cambridge University, Harwood has worked as an academic at Flinders University in South Australia.  He left Flinders University in 1997 to become a full-time writer.

While he is better known for his writing on poetry, Harwood made an impact with his first novel, The Ghost Writer, which was commended in literary awards in Australia and which was a winner of a major International Horror award.

Harwood is the son of the poet Gwen Harwood.

Awards

The Miles Franklin Award for The Ghost Writer, longlisted 2005
The Commonwealth Writers Prize The Ghost Writer, commended South East Asia and South Pacific Region, Best First Book section, 2005
International Horror Guild Award for The Ghost Writer, Best First Novel winner 2005
Dracula Society, Children of the Night Award for The Ghost Writer, winner 2004
Aurealis Award for The Seance, Best Horror Novel 2008

Bibliography

Novels
 The Ghost Writer (Jonathan Cape, 2004) 
 The Seance (Jonathan Cape, 2008) 
 The Asylum (2013)

Biography and literary criticism
Olivia Shakespear and W.B. Yeats : after long silence (Macmillan, 1989)
Eliot to Derrida : the poverty of interpretation (Macmillan, 1995)

References

External links

1946 births
21st-century Australian novelists
Australian male novelists
Australian poets
Living people
Australian male poets
21st-century Australian male writers